The 2022 Tour de France was the 109th edition of the Tour de France. It started in Copenhagen, Denmark on 1 July 2022 and ended with the final stage on the Champs-Élysées, Paris on 24 July 2022. Denmark's Jonas Vingegaard won the general classification for the first time. Two-time defending champion Tadej Pogačar finished in second place, and former winner Geraint Thomas finished third. This was the first Tour since 1989 in which each of the three podium finishers had made the podium on a previous occasion.

The race began in Copenhagen before returning to France. Wout van Aert of  controlled the lead for much of the first week until Pogačar seized control of the race and won two consecutive stages. In the Alps,  attacked Pogačar, and Vingegaard became the first rider to take serious time from Pogačar. Vingegaard defended and increased his lead through the Pyrenees and the final individual time trial to secure the victory. He thereby became the first Dane to win the Tour since Bjarne Riis in 1996.

The race was affected by climate-change protests as well as a  heat wave.

The points classification was won by Wout van Aert with 480 points, breaking Peter Sagan's modern-day record. Vingegaard also won the mountains classification, marking the first time since 1969 that riders from the same team won the yellow and green jerseys as well as the mountains classification. The young rider classification was won by GC runner-up Pogačar, and the team of  won the team classification. Van Aert was chosen as the most combative rider.

The race was followed by the first edition of the Tour de France Femmes, which had its first stage on the final day of the men's Tour.

Teams

22 teams participated in the race. All 18 UCI WorldTeams were automatically invited. They were joined by 4 UCI ProTeams - the two highest placed UCI ProTeams in 2021 (Alpecin–Deceuninck and Arkéa–Samsic), along with Team TotalEnergies and B&B Hotels–KTM who were selected by Amaury Sport Organisation (ASO), the organisers of the Tour. The teams were announced on 11 February 2022. 176 riders started the race, from 27 nationalities – with the largest percentage being French (11% of the peloton).

UCI WorldTeams

 
 
 
 
 
 
 
 
 
 
 
 
 
 
 
 
 
 

UCI ProTeams

Route and stages
However, due to the COVID-19 pandemic, this was delayed to 2022. In October 2021, the route was announced by Christian Prudhomme. Three stages took place in Denmark, with an opening time trial in Copenhagen. Other features of the Tour include 11 cobbled sectors on stage 5 (cobbles last featured in 2018), a gravel summit finish at La Super Planche des Belles Filles on stage 7, and a summit finish on Col du Granon on stage 11 (the Col du Granon was last used in 1986). The queen stage took place on Bastille Day, with a replica of Stage 18 of the 1986 Tour to Alpe d'Huez.

Pre-race favourites

Race overview

Grand Départ and Week One 
The race began in Copenhagen, Denmark for the first time, with three stages in Denmark. Danish rider Magnus Cort of EF Education–EasyPost took all King of the Mountains (KoM) points available in Denmark, collecting enough for him to wear the polka dot jersey until stage 9. During this run he claimed the record of most consecutive summits won, from former Tour champion and multi-time mountains classification winner Federico Bahamontes. Sprinter Dylan Groenewegen of  won the final stage in Denmark, before a transfer day and return to France.

On stage 4, van Aert extended his lead with a solo attack into Calais. Stage 5 involved cobbles for the first time since 2018, with Pogačar gaining time in the general classification over every  contender including Vingegaard, who had mechanical issues, and Roglič who crashed and dislocated his shoulder. Stage 6 was the longest of the race, with van Aert taking part in the breakaway to extend his lead in the points classification, before eventually being caught and falling off the back losing the overall lead. In the final uphill sprint, Pogačar out sprinted everyone to win the stage and take the maillot jaune by virtue of the bonus seconds.

Stage 7 was the first summit finish of the race at Super Planche des Belles Filles. A group of  contenders made their way up the majority of the climb together, before Vingegaard attacked and only Pogačar could follow. In a sprint on the final slope, Pogačar overtook Vingegaard to get the stage win and extend his lead to over 30 seconds. Other  contenders lost between 20 seconds and over a minute to the leading two. After stage 8, a hilly stage that finished in Lausanne, Switzerland where van Aert extended his points classification lead further, and stage 9 in the Swiss Alps where Bob Jungels won the day and Simon Geschke gained enough  points to take the polka dot jersey, the first rest day took place in Morzine.

Week Two 
During the second week, stages 10 and 18 were disrupted by Climate Change protesters, which forced stages to be halted for a short period. Media discussed the legitimacy of the protest and the effect that climate change was having on the Tour, while other coverage expressed annoyance at the disruption to the race. Some riders suffered heat stroke including Alexis Vuillermoz on stage 9.

No major attacks by  contenders occurred on stage 10, the first in the French Alps, however Lennard Kämna who was in the breakaway that finished close to ten minutes ahead of the peloton, came within eleven seconds of taking the yellow jersey from Pogačar. The stage was won by Magnus Cort, in a photo finish ahead of Nick Schultz. Stage 11 was a summit finish at the Col du Granon – which was included in the Tour for the first time since 1986. After constant attacks by Roglič and Vingegaard on the flat before the Col du Galibier, a gap opened up between Pogačar and Vingegaard on the final ascent to Col du Granon. Vingegaard gained nearly three minutes on Pogačar, winning the stage and taking the yellow jersey. At the end of the day only six riders were within five minutes of Vingegaard in the overall situation: Bardet, Pogačar, Thomas, Quintana, Yates and Gaudu.

Stage 12 to Alpe d'Huez was the queen stage of the Tour, taking place on Bastille Day. Neilson Powless of Team  attacked at kilometre zero and stayed at the front of the race until near the very end. Tom Pidcock of Ineos Grenadiers and former Tour winner Chris Froome, attacked about halfway through the stage and bridged up to the leading breakaway riders. On the final ascent of Alpe d'Huez, Pidcock attacked from the group including Powless, Froome, Ciccone and Meintjes and rode on to a convincing solo victory. In the  race, Pogačar attacked Vingegaard twice, with both riders dropping the other contenders on the climb, however the Slovenian rider was unable to shake off the Dane.

Behind Matthews, Pogačar and Vingegaard attacked the peloton on this same climb and extended their lead over the other  contenders. Stage 15, before the second rest day, took the Tour to Carcassonne where the final breakaway rider in Benjamin Thomas was caught in the final few hundred meters to set up a sprint finish, which was won by Jasper Philipsen. Jumbo–Visma lost two riders on stage 15: team leader Roglič abandoned the race following his injuries on stage 5, and domestique Steven Kruijswijk left the race in an ambulance after dislocating his shoulder in a crash.

Week Three 
After a rest day in Carcassonne, the race entered the Pyrenees. Rafał Majka, a "key lieutenant" of Pogačar did not start stage 17, due to an injury suffered after he threw his chain near the end of stage 16. Brandon McNulty of UAE Team Emirates pulled his teammate Pogačar and Vingegaard up to the final steep slopes of Peyragudes, increasing the gap to the rest of the peloton. Inside the final 500m of steep climbing Pogačar attacked, but Vingegaard responded and followed with a counter attack of his own.

On stage 18 – the final day in the Pyrenees – Pogačar attacked Vingegaard multiple times on the Col de Spandelles, with Vingegaard able to keep up every time. On the descent, both riders pushed hard: Vingegaard almost crashed, while Pogačar did crash after slipping on gravel. Pogačar was able to continue with minor cuts to his leg; in a moment of sportsmanship, Vingegaard slowed down and waited for Pogačar.

Before the ascent of the Hautacam, both riders were caught by a larger group including Thomas and two of Vingegaard's teammates (Sepp Kuss and Tiesj Benoot). On the final climb, a furious pace was set by Kuss, leaving all other contenders behind. Pogačar was unable to keep up, so Vingegaard extended his  lead to almost three and a half minutes. By taking maximum  points at the top of Hautacam, Vingegaard gained an unassailable lead of that classification, taking the jersey from Simon Geschke of Team , who had set a record for most days by a German rider leading the mountains classification.

After the transitional stage 19 was won by Christophe Laporte of Jumbo-Visma, the final time trial to Rocamadour was won by van Aert, followed by Vingegaard, Pogačar and Thomas. The traditional final stage on the Champs-Élysées in Paris completed the Tour, with sprinter Jasper Philipsen winning his second stage of the Tour.

In the general classification, Vingegaard became the first Dane to win the Tour since 1996, with Pogačar in second 2 minutes 43 seconds behind. Thomas was third, over seven minutes behind. The points classification was won by Wout van Aert with 480 points, breaking Peter Sagan's modern record. Vingegaard also won the mountains classification, marking the first time since the Faema team of Eddy Merckx in 1969, that riders from the same team won the yellow and green jerseys as well as the mountains classification. The young rider classification was won by runner-up Pogačar, who led the classification from start to finish and tied Jan Ullrich and Andy Schleck with his third win of this classification. The team of third place Thomas, Ineos Grenadiers, won the team classification. Van Aert was chosen as the most combative rider. Caleb Ewan was the Lanterne rouge - normally competitive with the elite sprinters, his top 10 result on stage 21 was his highest stage finish of the Tour.

The race had the fewest finishers since 2000, with just 135 of the 176 starters reaching the finish line in Paris. The teams of the first two podium finishers were severely depleted by the end of the race, with Team UAE Emirates losing half its start list due to injury and illness, and Team Jumbo-Visma losing several key members along the route.

In August 2022, Colombian rider Nairo Quintana of Arkéa–Samsic was disqualified from 6th place overall, after blood samples tested positive for tramadol, a painkiller.

Classification leadership

Final classification standings

General classification

Points classification

Mountains classification

Young rider classification

Team classification

Notes 

As of 1 March 2022, the UCI announced that cyclists from Russia and Belarus would no longer compete under the name or flag of those respective countries due to the Russian invasion of Ukraine.

References

External links

 

 
2022 in Danish sport
2022 in French sport
2022 in road cycling
2022 UCI World Tour
July 2022 sports events in France
2022